Throwback Throwdown is a professional wrestling Impact Plus event, produced by American professional wrestling promotion Impact Wrestling. The event was created in 2019 and since its inception, the event features wrestlers portraying 1980s characters and gimmicks in the fictional Impact Provincial Wrestling Federation (IPWF). Each event features talent from Impact competing in various professional wrestling match types.  Due to the nature of the event, the storylines for Throwback Throwdown have been self-contained and independent from the rest of Impact's programming.

History 
Throwback Throwdown is a professional wrestling event consisting of a main event and undercard that feature championship matches and other various matches. The first Throwback Throwdown was a special episode of Impact that aired on November 26, 2019 and saw wrestlers portraying 1980's characters and gimmicks in the fictional Impact Provincial Wrestling Federation (IPWF). Throwback Throwdown II was held at Davis Arena in Louisville, Kentucky on December 18, 2021 as an Impact Plus Monthly Special.  On November 2, 2022, Impact announced that Throwback Throwdown III would take place on November 25 at Benton Convention Center in Winston-Salem, North Carolina as a part of WrestleCade, with the matches from that event set to air on December 2 as an Impact Plus Monthly Special.

Events

Notes

References

External links 
 ImpactWrestling.com - the official website of Impact Wrestling

Impact Plus Monthly Specials
Impact Wrestling shows